Äriküla (Erküll in German) is a village in Mulgi Parish in Viljandi County in southern Estonia. It borders the villages Ainja, Lilli, and Metsaküla.

References

Villages in Viljandi County
Kreis Pernau